The 1876 Missouri gubernatorial election was held on November 7, 1876 and resulted in a victory for the Democratic nominee, former Congressman (and 1868 gubernatorial nominee) John S. Phelps, over the Republican candidate, former Congressman Gustavus A. Finkelnburg, and Greenback nominee J. P. Alexander.

Results

References

Missouri
1876
Gubernatorial
November 1876 events